The Spanish–American War Veterans Memorial, also known as the Soldier's Monument and Graves, is an outdoor memorial commemorating those who fought in the Spanish–American War, installed at Portland, Oregon's River View Cemetery, in the United States. The memorial is located near the cemetery's Southwest Taylors Ferry Road entrance where 165 headstones surround the statue.

See also

 Spanish–American War Soldier's Monument, Portland, Oregon

References

External links
 

Cemetery art
Monuments and memorials in Portland, Oregon
Outdoor sculptures in Portland, Oregon
Sculptures of men in Oregon
Spanish–American War memorials in the United States
Statues in Portland, Oregon
Southwest Portland, Oregon